Surfing the Menu is an Australian television cooking and lifestyle series on the ABC which first screened in 2003. The series follows features two chefs who follow their passions as they travel around Australia and New Zealand.

The first three seasons were presented by Curtis Stone and Ben O'Donoghue. The fourth season also featured episodes presented by O'Donoghue and Mark Gardner.

Episodes
Season 1 (2003)
S1 E1 Abrolhos Islands
S1 E2 Broome
S1 E3 Margaret River 
S1 E4 Tasmania
S1 E5 New Norcia
S1 E6 Hunter Valley
S1 E7 Bellarine Peninsula
S1 E8 Byron Bay

Season 2 (2004)
S2 E1 Cairns
S2 E2 Ningaloo Coast
S2 E3 Kakadu
S2 E4 Freo & Rotto
S2 E5 Mornington Peninsula
S2 E6 Albany
S2 E7 Eyre Peninsula
S2 E8 Sydney

Season 3 (2005)
S1 E1 Tiwi Islands
S3 E2 The Kimberlies
S3 E3 Noosa
S3 E4 Sapphire Coast
S3 E5 Yarra Valley
S3 E6 Fleurieu Peninsula
S3 E7 Cockburn Sound 
S3 E8 Esperance

Season 4 (2006)
S4 E1 Otago/Canterbury
S4 E2 Marlborough 
S4 E3 Gisborne  
S4 E4 Southern Lakes
S4 E5 Wairrarapa 
S4 E6 Hawkes Bay 
S4 E7 Rotorua 
S4 E8 Northland

Surfing the Menu: The Next Generation
A new season began on 22 May 2016 known as Surfing the Menu: The Next Generation presented by Hayden Quinn and Dan Churchill.

Episodes
Season 1 (2016)
S1 E1. Shark Bay - 29 May 2016
S1 E2. Wooramel Station - 29 May 2016
S1 E3. Carnarvon - 29 May 2016
S1 E4. Exmouth - 29 May 2016
S1 E5. Broome - 29 May 2016
S1 E6. Kununurra - 29 May 2016
S1 E7. Katherine - 29 May 2016
S1 E8. Cairns/Townsville - 29 May 2016
S1 E9. Whitsundays - 29 May 2016
S1 E10. Bundaberg - 29 May 2016
S1 E11. Noosa - 22 May 2016
S1 E12. Toowoomba - 29 May 2016
S1 E13. Byron Bay - 5 June 2016

References

External links 
 Official Website
 Official Website
 
 

Australian Broadcasting Corporation original programming
Australian non-fiction television series
2003 Australian television series debuts
2010s Australian television series
English-language television shows